Eric William Dane (born November 9, 1972) is an American actor. After multiple television roles in the 1990s and 2000s, which included his recurring role as Jason Dean in Charmed, Dane was cast as Dr. Mark Sloan on the ABC medical drama television series Grey's Anatomy. Following this, he made appearances in films such as Marley & Me (2008), Valentine's Day (2010), and Burlesque (2010). Dane has since played Captain Tom Chandler in the post-apocalyptic drama The Last Ship and currently stars as Cal Jacobs in the HBO series Euphoria.

Early life
Dane was born in San Francisco, California, to William Melvin. When Dane was 7 years old, his father died of a gunshot wound. Dane has a younger brother. They were raised in their mother's Jewish faith, and Dane had a bar mitzvah ceremony. He attended Sequoia High School in Redwood City, California, from 1987 to 1990, and San Mateo High School in San Mateo, California, from 1990 to 1991, where he graduated. Dane was an athlete in high school, playing on the boys' varsity water polo team, but pursued a career in acting after appearing in a school production of Arthur Miller's All My Sons.

Career
In 1993, Dane moved to Los Angeles, where he played small roles in the television series Saved by the Bell, The Wonder Years, Roseanne, and Married... with Children, among others. But in 2000, he was signed for a recurring role in Gideon's Crossing, and followed this with a two-season run as Jason Dean in Charmed. His made-for-television film credits included two biopics, Serving in Silence (about Margarethe Cammermeyer's experiences in the military), and Helter Skelter, in which he portrayed Charles "Tex" Watson, a member of the Manson family.

Dane's first major feature film appearance was in The Basket. He also appeared in Zoe, Duncan, Jack & Jane, Sol Goode, Feast, X-Men: The Last Stand, and starred in Open Water 2.
In 2005, Dane guested as Dr. Mark Sloan in "Yesterday", the eighteenth episode of the second season of the ABC medical drama Grey's Anatomy. Positive audience reaction to the character led to Dane's becoming a regular in the show's third season. His first appearance in the season, in which he walked out of the bathroom soaking wet and wearing only a strategically placed towel, was labeled a "watercooler moment". Dane resigned from the show after the end of season 8 but appeared in the first two episodes of season 9. In 2021, Dane reappeared on the show for the first time in nine years since his character was killed off.

In December 2006, he starred in the A&E television film Wedding Wars as the brother of a gay man (played by John Stamos) who goes on strike in support of same-sex marriage.
Dane, alongside Patrick Dempsey, appeared in the same big-screen project, the 2010 romantic comedy Valentine's Day. The Garry Marshall-directed film followed five interconnecting stories about Los Angelenos anticipating (or in some cases dreading) the holiday.

In October 2012, Dane joined the main cast of the Michael Bay-produced TNT drama series The Last Ship. He is also credited as a producer on the show.

Personal life
Dane married actress Rebecca Gayheart on October 29, 2004. They have two daughters together. In February 2018, Gayheart filed for divorce from Dane after 14 years of marriage, citing "irreconcilable differences".

In 2009, Dane made headlines when he was in a video that featured Dane, his wife and Kari Ann Peniche, nude and using drugs.

In June 2011, Dane entered a California treatment center to recover from a dependency on prescription drugs he had developed after suffering a sports injury.

In April 2017, The Last Ship halted production through Memorial Day to allow Dane to deal with the depression he was battling.

Filmography

Film

Television

References

External links
 
 Official Facebook Page

1972 births
Living people
20th-century American male actors
21st-century American male actors
Male actors from California
American male film actors
American male television actors
Jewish American male actors
Male actors from San Francisco
21st-century American Jews